Voruta may have been the capital city of the Grand Duchy of Lithuania and the Kingdom of Lithuania during the reign of king Mindaugas in the 13th century. Voruta is mentioned briefly in a written source only once and its exact location is unknown. Despite all the uncertainties, the concept of Voruta is well-known and popular in Lithuania.

Historiography
Mindaugas, the first and the only crowned Lithuanian king, defended himself in Voruta during an internal war against his nephews Tautvilas and Edivydas and Duke of Samogitia Vykintas in 1251. This information, taken from the Hypatian Chronicle, is the only recorded message about Voruta. A castle of Mindaugas was mentioned on two more occasions, but neither its name nor location was specified. It is unclear whether these brief mentions referred to the same location.

Nevertheless, some historians in 19th and 20th centuries called it "the first capital of Lithuania" and attempted to identify its location. In total there were about fifteen suggested locations of Voruta. Others argue that Voruta was not an actual city, but just a misinterpretation of a word that means capital. In the opinion of Kazimieras Būga, one of the prominent Lithuanian philologists, the word voruta simply means castle.

List of suggested locations

These sites were suggested by various historians in various times:
 Berzgainiai in Ukmergė district by Petras Tarasenka 
 Buteikiai in Anykščiai district by Kazimieras Žebrys
 Gorodishche near Navahrudak by Teodor Narbutt
 Halshany by 
 Kernavė by Fryderyk Papée
 Karelichy by Mikola Yermalovich
 Liškiava by Jonas Totoraitis
 Medininkai by Evaldas Gečiauskas
 Ročiškė in Raseiniai district by Ludwik Krzywicki
 Šeimyniškėliai in Anykščiai district by Eduards Volters (supported by Tomas Baranauskas)
 Ūturiai in Raseiniai district by Wojciech Kętrzyński
 Varniany in Hrodna Voblast, Belarus by Juliusz Latkowski
 Vilnius by Romas Batūra
 Area of Daugai–Varėna by Henryk Łowmiański
 Area of Medvėgalis–Varniai by Antanas Steponaitis

Since publication, some of the theories have been largely discredited.

References

Castles in Lithuania
Hill forts in Lithuania
Former populated places in Eastern Europe